Alexander Kristoff (born 5 July 1987) is a Norwegian professional road bicycle racer, who currently rides for UCI ProTeam . He won the Norwegian National Road Race Championships in 2007 and 2011. His biggest victories have been the 2014 Milan–San Remo and the 2015 Tour of Flanders among many other successes.

Career

Early career
At six, he moved from Oslo to Stavanger. His stepfather got him interested in cycling rather than football. He started riding for Stavanger SK. At 16 he won the Norwegian National Road Race Championships in the youth category, and finished fourth at the European Youth Summer Olympic Festival. In 2007, he won the Norwegian National Road Race Championships at 19, beating Thor Hushovd in a sprint of four riders.

Katusha (2012–2017)

He won a bronze medal in the road race at the 2012 London Olympic Games.

2014 season

In 2014 Kristoff won Milan–San Remo beating Fabian Cancellara in the sprint. Later the same year Kristoff claimed two stage wins in the Tour de France making him runner-up behind Peter Sagan in the points classification. Later in the season Kristoff took another victory when he claimed first place in the Vattenfall Cyclassics, after a previous win on German soil in May at the Eschborn–Frankfurt – Rund um den Finanzplatz. In total Kristoff took 14 victories in the 2014 season ranking him eighth in points on the 2014 UCI World Tour season standings.

2015 season

In 2015, Kristoff had a very good start to his campaign by getting three stage victories at the Tour of Qatar, grabbing the points classification jersey in the process. He celebrated another stage victory soon afterward at the Tour of Oman. On 1 March, he was outsprinted by Mark Cavendish and finished in second position at Kuurne–Brussels–Kuurne. He earned another sprint victory at Paris–Nice, while he was preparing himself for Milan–San Remo. He was looking for a repeat victory at that race, but John Degenkolb had the better of him in the sprint finish and he settled for second position. Still in the month of March, he went on to finish just shy of the podium in E3 Harelbeke, taking fourth place. He then participated in the Three Days of De Panne, where he was part of a six-man breakaway on the first stage and won the sprint of the small group, while being lead-out by his teammate Sven Erik Bystrøm. He repeated the next day, this time using a bunch sprint to propel himself to victory. Kristoff also won stage 3a, a bunch sprint where he very slightly edged André Greipel by 0.0003 seconds. With the bonus seconds awarded to him, he won the general classification too after finishing third on stage 3b, a short individual time trial.

In April, Kristoff won the cobbled monument Tour of Flanders, the main goal of his spring season. With some  remaining, Niki Terpstra attacked and only Kristoff went with him. The duo got a lead of 30 seconds with the remains of the lead group unable to catch them. Kristoff beat Terpstra in the two-man sprint, to take his biggest win up to that point. Three days later Kristoff won the sprinters' semi-classic Scheldeprijs, becoming the first rider to win the Three Days of De Panne, the Tour of Flanders and Scheldeprijs in the same season. Kristoff came in tenth at Paris–Roubaix, and then took a break from racing. He came back at the Tour of Norway, where he finished eighth overall while taking two stage successes. Shortly after, he participated in the Tour des Fjords where he dominated the sprints again by amassing three stage victories, the points classification jersey and a ninth overall position. He also won the seventh stage of the Tour de Suisse ahead of Peter Sagan. Sagan got out of Kristoff's slipstream to try to out-sprint him in the closing stages, but to no avail.

2016 season
In 2016, he started his season with a hat-trick of stage wins at the flat Tour of Qatar, finishing in second position in the overall classification to Mark Cavendish.

2017 season
In August 2017, Kristoff won the men's road race at the UEC European Road Championships in Denmark.

UAE Team Emirates (2018–2021)
Later in August 2017, it was confirmed that Kristoff had signed an initial two-year deal with  starting from the 2018 season. He moved there with fellow Norwegian Sven Erik Bystrøm.

2018 season
Kristoff started his first season with his new team at the Dubai Tour. He followed this up with appearances at two more stage races in the Middle East. At the Tour of Oman, he won the sixth and final stage. His second win of the season came in the opening stage of the Abu Dhabi Tour. At the Tour de France, he won the last stage in a sprint on the Champs-Élysées in Paris.

2019 season
In June 2019, Kristoff extended his  contract by a further two years, to the end of the 2021 season.

2020 season
In August, Kristoff won the opening stage of the Tour de France, taking the yellow jersey as a result. The following day, he lost the jersey to Julian Alaphilippe on a high mountain stage.

Personal life
Kristoff married Maren Kommedal at Stavanger Cathedral in October 2014, and the couple have four children.

Major results

2005
 2nd Time trial, National Junior Road Championships
 10th Road race, UCI Juniors World Championships
2006
 Grenland GP
1st Stages 1 & 2
2007
 1st  Road race, National Road Championships
 5th Poreč Trophy
 6th Colliers Classic
2008
 1st  Criterium, National Road Championships
 1st Stage 4 Ringerike GP
 2nd Rogaland Grand Prix
 2nd Poreč Trophy
2009
 1st  Road race, National Under-23 Road Championships
 1st Stage 3 Ringerike GP
 2nd Road race, National Road Championships
 2nd Sandefjord Grand Prix
 5th Overall Tour de Bretagne
 5th La Côte Picarde
 7th Road race, UEC European Under-23 Road Championships
 7th Druivenkoers Overijse
 9th Poreč Trophy
 9th ZLM Tour
 10th Ronde Van Vlaanderen Beloften
2010
 3rd Philadelphia International Championship
 4th Vattenfall Cyclassics
 5th Grand Prix de Fourmies
 7th Kampioenschap van Vlaanderen
 8th Grote Prijs Jef Scherens
 9th Paris–Bruxelles
 10th Scheldeprijs
 10th Memorial Rik Van Steenbergen
2011
 1st  Road race, National Road Championships
 2nd Grand Prix de Fourmies
 5th Grand Prix d'Isbergues
 7th Scheldeprijs
 7th Paris–Bruxelles
 7th London–Surrey Cycle Classic
 7th Kampioenschap van Vlaanderen
2012
 Three Days of De Panne
1st  Points classification
1st Stage 3a
 2nd Grand Prix de Fourmies
 3rd  Road race, Olympic Games
 3rd Road race, National Road Championships
 3rd Overall World Ports Classic
1st  Young rider classification
 4th Overall Danmark Rundt
1st  Points classification
1st Stage 4
 6th Eschborn–Frankfurt – Rund um den Finanzplatz
 9th Kuurne–Brussels–Kuurne
2013
 Tour of Norway
1st Stages 1, 2 & 5
 1st Stage 5 Tour de Suisse
 2nd Road race, National Road Championships
 2nd Overall Three Days of De Panne
1st  Points classification
1st Stage 3a
 3rd Vattenfall Cyclassics
 4th Overall Tour des Fjords
1st  Points classification
1st Stages 2 & 3 (TTT)
 4th Tour of Flanders
 4th Brussels Cycling Classic
 5th Scheldeprijs
 8th Milan–San Remo
 9th Paris–Roubaix
2014
 1st  Overall Tour des Fjords
1st  Points classification
1st Stages 2, 4 & 5
 1st Milan–San Remo
 1st Eschborn–Frankfurt – Rund um den Finanzplatz
 1st Vattenfall Cyclassics
 Tour of Norway
1st  Points classification
1st Stages 1 & 5
 Tour de France
1st Stages 12 & 15
 1st Stage 2 Tour of Oman
 2nd Overall Arctic Race of Norway
1st  Points classification
1st Stages 2 & 4
 5th Tour of Flanders
 8th Road race, UCI Road World Championships
 8th UCI World Tour
 8th Overall Three Days of De Panne
 8th GP Ouest–France
2015
 1st  Overall Three Days of De Panne
1st  Points classification
1st Stages 1, 2 & 3a
 1st Tour of Flanders
 1st GP Ouest–France
 1st Scheldeprijs
 1st Grand Prix of Aargau Canton
 Arctic Race of Norway
1st  Points classification
1st Stage 1
 1st Stage 1 Paris–Nice
 1st Stage 7 Tour de Suisse
 1st Stage 3 Tour of Oman
 2nd Milan–San Remo
 2nd Vattenfall Cyclassics
 2nd Kuurne–Brussels–Kuurne
 3rd Overall Tour of Qatar
1st  Points classification
1st Stages 2, 4 & 5
 3rd Grand Prix Cycliste de Québec
 4th UCI World Tour
 4th Road race, UCI Road World Championships
 4th E3 Harelbeke
 8th Overall Tour of Norway
1st  Points classification
1st Stages 1 & 2
 9th Overall Tour des Fjords
1st  Points classification
1st Stages 1, 2 & 3
 9th Gent–Wevelgem
 10th Paris–Roubaix
2016
 1st  Overall Tour des Fjords
1st  Points classification
1st Stages 2, 3 & 5
 1st Eschborn–Frankfurt – Rund um den Finanzplatz
 Tour of Oman
1st Stages 3 & 6
 1st Stage 1 Arctic Race of Norway
 1st Stage 7 Tour of California
 2nd Road race, National Road Championships
 2nd Overall Tour of Qatar
1st  Points classification
1st Stages 2, 4 & 5
 2nd Overall Three Days of De Panne
1st  Points classification
1st Stage 1
 2nd Kuurne–Brussels–Kuurne
 3rd Bretagne Classic
 4th Tour of Flanders
 5th EuroEyes Cyclassics
 6th Milan–San Remo
 7th Road race, UCI Road World Championships
2017
 1st  Road race, UEC European Road Championships
 1st Eschborn–Frankfurt – Rund um den Finanzplatz
 1st London–Surrey Classic
 Tour of Oman
1st  Points classification
1st Stages 1, 4 & 6
 Étoile de Bessèges
1st  Points classification
1st Stage 2
 1st  Points classification, Tour of Britain
 2nd  Road race, UCI Road World Championships
 2nd Bretagne Classic
 3rd Overall Three Days of De Panne
1st  Points classification
1st Stage 2
 4th Overall Arctic Race of Norway
1st Stage 2
 4th Milan–San Remo
 4th EuroEyes Cyclassics
 5th Tour of Flanders
 7th Münsterland Giro
2018
 1st Eschborn–Frankfurt
 1st Grand Prix of Aargau Canton
 1st Stage 21 Tour de France
 1st Stage 1 Abu Dhabi Tour
 1st Stage 6 Tour of Oman
 3rd EuroEyes Cyclassics
 4th Milan–San Remo
 6th Grand Prix de Fourmies
 9th Overall Dubai Tour
2019
 1st  Overall Tour of Norway
1st  Points classification
1st Stage 5
 1st Gent–Wevelgem
 1st Grand Prix of Aargau Canton
 1st Stage 1 Tour of Oman
 1st Stage 1a Okolo Slovenska
 1st Stage 2 Deutschland Tour
 3rd Tour of Flanders
 3rd Eschborn–Frankfurt
 4th Road race, UEC European Road Championships
 4th EuroEyes Cyclassics
 7th Road race, UCI Road World Championships
 7th London–Surrey Classic
 7th Brussels Cycling Classic
2020
 Tour de France
1st Stage 1
Held  after Stage 1
Held  after Stages 1 & 2
 2nd Clásica de Almería
 3rd Tour of Flanders
 3rd Kuurne–Brussels–Kuurne
2021
 1st  Points classification, Arctic Race of Norway
 2nd Trofeo Alcúdia – Port d'Alcúdia
 3rd Overall Deutschland Tour
1st Stages 2 & 4
 3rd Eschborn–Frankfurt
 5th Trofeo Serra de Tramuntana
 6th Dwars door Vlaanderen
2022
 1st Scheldeprijs
 1st Clásica de Almería
 1st Circuit Franco–Belge
 1st Stage 2 Deutschland Tour
 1st Stage 6 Tour of Norway
 2nd Road race, National Road Championships
 2nd Grand Prix du Morbihan
 3rd Milano–Torino
 3rd Eschborn–Frankfurt
 4th Paris–Bourges
 6th Road race, UCI Road World Championships
 7th Gooikse Pijl
 8th Road race, UEC European Road Championships
 9th Brussels Cycling Classic
 10th Tour of Flanders
 10th BEMER Cyclassics
2023
 1st Stage 1 Volta ao Algarve
 4th Omloop Het Nieuwsblad
 4th Clásica de Almería

Classics results timeline

Grand Tour general classification results timeline

References

External links

 

Norwegian male cyclists
1987 births
Living people
Sportspeople from Stavanger
Cyclists at the 2012 Summer Olympics
Olympic cyclists of Norway
Olympic bronze medalists for Norway
Olympic medalists in cycling
Cyclists from Oslo
Medalists at the 2012 Summer Olympics
Tour de Suisse stage winners
Norwegian Tour de France stage winners
2014 Tour de France stage winners
Tour de France Champs Elysées stage winners